Leetspeak Monsters (stylized as Leetspeak monsters) is a Japanese visual kei rock band whose songs and appearance are centered around Halloween and dark fantasy themes. The band members perform as characters from the fictional city of "Gravetown", with each adopting an archetypal "monster" persona.

History 

Leetspeak Monsters released their first single "Monster's Party" with label GLK Music in 2017, following band leader D13's concept of creating a "crossover of rock and hip hop within the imagery of a haunted house." In the same year, the band released a mini-album Storyteller in the Strange Night, followed by their first full-length album Monster's Theater, which ranked in the top 100 on the Oricon album chart.

The band's subsequent releases continued to expand the mythology of Leetspeak Monsters' fictional home of "Gravetown", with lyrics in English and Japanese about normal people having scary encounters. D13 insists that the true meaning of the band's name will remain a secret, saying that he enjoys hearing different interpretations from their audience.

In 2018, Leetspeak Monsters released the mini-album Mixtured night between Life and Death and a single covering The Nightmare Before Christmas theme song "This is Halloween", resulting from D13's admiration of filmmaker Tim Burton and composer Danny Elfman.

On May 26, 2018, Leetspeak Monsters began their one-man tour of Japan called "Leetspeak monsters 1st Oneman Tour Life and Death Tour - Seija to sisya no yoru". The tour went across 3 cities with the final performance at Takadanobaba CLUB PHASE on June 3.

In 2019, the band released the maxi-single 13th Friday Night and their second full album Monster's Theater II. They also contributed an original song, "Gekkouin -Moonlight Shadow", to the album Bad Ass Temple Funky Sounds from seiyuu rap project Hypnosis Mic.

In 2020, Leetspeak Monsters released the maxi-single "Beltane", named after the Gaelic bonfire ritual.

Band members 
Current members

 D13 (skeleton cemetery guide) - vocals (2009–present)
 Euskyss (vampire prince) - bass (2011–present)
 Yo’shmeer (Frankenstein's monster) - guitar (2017–present)
 DieWolf (werewolf) - drums (2011–present)

Former members

 Mattünurg - guitar

Discography

Studio albums

Singles and EPs

Videography

Music Videos 

 2017: "Monster's Party"
 2017: "Black Owl"
 2018: "This is Halloween"
 2018: "Wonderland"
 2018: "Greenman"
 2019: "13th Friday night"
 2019: "Gothic"
 2020: "Beltane"

References

External links 

 

Visual kei musical groups
Japanese rock music groups
Musical groups established in 2017
2017 establishments in Japan